Osicki Glacier is a narrow, deeply entrenched glacier just south of Mount Deakin in the Commonwealth Range, flowing west into Beardmore Glacier. Named by Advisory Committee on Antarctic Names (US-ACAN) for Kenneth J. Osicki, United States Antarctic Research Program (USARP) biologist at McMurdo Station, 1963.

Glaciers of Dufek Coast